The following lists events that happened during 1983 in Cape Verde.

Incumbents
President: Aristides Pereira
Prime Minister: Pedro Pires

Events

Sports
Académica Operária won the Cape Verdean Football Championship

Births
March 9: Edson Silva, footballer
March 14: José Emílio Furtado, footballer
June 10: Nélson Marcos, footballer
September 20: Calú, footballer

References

 
Years of the 20th century in Cape Verde
1980s in Cape Verde
Cape Verde
Cape Verde